Hitman (Tommy Monaghan) is a fictional character, a superpowered hitman in the DC Comics Universe. The character was created by Garth Ennis and John McCrea and first appeared in The Demon Annual #2 before receiving his own series by Ennis and McCrea that ran for 61 issues.

Background
Hitman chronicles the exploits of Tommy Monaghan, an ex-Marine Gulf War veteran turned contract killer from the Cauldron, a lower-class Irish district of Gotham City. He first appears in The Demon Annual #2 (part of the "Bloodlines" crossover in the summer of 1993), when he is attacked and bitten by a Bloodlines parasite called Glonth. Instead of dying, the bite unexpectedly triggers his metagene and grants him x-ray vision and moderate telepathy. A side effect is that his corneas and irises are solid black, indistinguishable from his pupils; the sight managed to unnerve Batman when he first saw them. The inherited powers later come with limits, and Monaghan uses them selectively, both because of the difficulty of concentrating during an explosive firefight and the side effects of their extended use (which includes anything between a headache and a minor illness).

After gaining these powers, Monaghan decides to specialize in killing metahumans and supernatural threats, targets typically shunned by conventional contract killers as too dangerous or too expensive. Despite his powers, Monaghan relies most on his creativity, improvisational abilities, and impressive gunfighting skills to take down a majority of his targets. This specialty line of work gives him an edge over his competition, but also leads him to encountering a number of eclectic characters including demons, zombies, dinosaurs, gods, superheroes and supervillains, as well as more conventional, realistic characters such as CIA agents, the SAS and the Mafia.

The series is firmly entrenched in the DC Universe. Batman, the Joker, Green Lantern, Catwoman, Etrigan, and Superman all guest star at various points, and joking references are frequently made to then-current DC happenings (such as the long-haired Superman). The series also crossed over with many DC events, including Final Night, One Million, and No Man's Land. Monaghan also teamed with Lobo and has made a few appearances outside the series.

Although the character adopts the moniker "Hitman" in his first appearance, the name is never used in his own series; the rest of the time, he is referred to by his given name (although he was sometimes called "Hitman" in guest appearances).

Characters

The series

Hitman first appeared during Garth Ennis's run on The Demon during the "Bloodlines" crossover, and subsequently appeared in two further arcs before the series was cancelled. After making a brief appearance in a Batman comic, he got his own self-titled series.

Hitman was first published as a 60-issue comic book series with one annual, one DC One Million tie-in issue, one crossover with Lobo and one appearance in Sovereign Seven #26. Issues were more or less published monthly and most were 22 pages.

Several collections were published in trade paperback, but the second half of the series had initially never been collected. What collections that had been published were left to go out-of-print over the years. In July 2009 DC began reprinting the trades, from the beginning, with some variation.

The character was due to make an appearance in an arc of JLA Classified, and Ennis had this to say about it:

I miss Hitman a lot. Preacher finished when it was supposed to, so there are no regrets with it—but Hitman could have gone on a lot longer. John McCrea and I are actually doing four issues of JLA Classified, featuring what is effectively the "lost" Hitman story, the one that we never had space for in the monthly. Writing Tommy and the boys again was sheer joy".

Because of the backlog of other stories for the series, DC decided to release the story as a two issue miniseries titled JLA/Hitman.

Trades
Starting in 2009, the entire Hitman series is being reprinted or collected for the first time in seven volumes.

Vol. 1: Hitman
 In "Hitman" (The Demon Annual #2), a hitman named Tommy Monaghan is bitten by Glonth, an alien (from Bloodlines), and gets superhuman powers. He teams up with Etrigan the Demon to fight Glonth and kills Joe Dubelz, a mob boss whose Siamese twin brother Moe puts a price on Tommy's head. The issue also introduces Pat, Sean, and Noonan's Sleazy Bar.
 In "Hitman" (Batman Chronicles #4), Tommy takes a hit on a walking biological agent named Thrax who escaped into Gotham, and a "tenth-rate assassin" named Martin Eckstein attempts to earn the Dubelz reward. Eckstein, captured by Batman, reveals that Tommy is going to kill the Joker in Arkham Asylum.
 In "A Rage in Arkham" (issues #1-3), Tommy begins a relationship with a woman named Wendy. He tells her that he is a killer, but she believes it is all an elaborate joke. Tommy enters Arkham by use of stun grenades on several police. Tommy, Batman, Detective Tiegel and the real Joker have multiple encounters; it is all because of the demonic Arkanonne, the Lords of Gunfire, and their agent, the Mawzir, who want Tommy to work for them.

Vol. 2: 10,000 Bullets
 "10,000 Bullets" (#4-7) begins with Moe Dubelz hiring Johnny Navarone to kill Tommy. Navarone hires Tommy (and Natt, newly arrived in Gotham) for a hit and then injures them in an ambush. Tommy makes Natt take him to Wendy's and calls Sean to perform medical services. As soon as Tommy is healthy, she throws them out and dumps him. They go home to find Pat dying, tortured by Navarone for information. Tommy and Nat kill Dubelz, his men and Navarone.
 In "The Night the Lights Went Out" (#8), a crossover with The Final Night, Tommy, Natt, Sean, Hacken and Ringo sit in Noonan's and recount stories of the closest each has come to death. Ringo specifically tells about the time (he believes) he met Death.
 In 2010, this trade was reprinted with an additional story: In "Coffin Full of Dollars" (Annual #1), Tommy and Natt become involved in a power struggle in a small Texan town. The art for the annual was provided by Carlos Ezquerra and Steve Pugh. Kevin Smith provided the intro.

Vol. 3: Local Heroes
 "Local Heroes" (#9-12) opens with Pat Noonan's funeral. Tiegel is kicked off the police force because she is an honest cop, unlike the corrupt Captain Burns, her former boss. He makes an enemy with CIA agent Truman, who wants him for a metahuman killing group. Detective Tiegel works with Tommy; they expose Burns.
 In "Zombie Night at the Gotham Aquarium" (#13-14), Tommy, Natt, Ringo and Hacken take a contract from Injun Peak to stop a scientist from re-animating dead sea creatures. As the title indicates, they fail.
 The initial 1999 paperback included the above-referenced story from the Hitman Annual.

Vol. 4: Ace of Killers
 In "Ace of Killers" (#15-20), the Mawzir tricks Catwoman into stealing the Ace of Winchesters, a Winchester rifle forged in the old West to kill demons. Tommy and Natt form an impromptu alliance with Catwoman (spurned over being manipulated), a surprised Tiegel and Jason Blood, the occultist expert and keeper of Etrigan the Demon. Would-be superhero Sixpack even reforms his old team Section 8 to help out. A battle in Hell and in church ends with Etrigan the de facto ruler of Hell, the Mawzir dead again and the gun in new hands (the Ace of Winchesters was previously featured during Garth Ennis's run on Hellblazer. Jason Blood stole Etrigan's heart, with the help of Tommy, in The Demon #54, written by Ennis).
 In "Kiss Me" (#21), a misunderstanding after a romantic night with Tiegel leads to Tommy killing a valued mob officer in self-defense; this incident would have long-term consequences. This issue is the only issue of the series proper not illustrated by John McCrea; the art was done by Steve Pugh.
 In "The Santa Contract" (#22), the Christmas story, a power plant worker mutates into a radioactive Santa. Tommy is hired to kill him.

Vol. 5: Who Dares Wins (2001)
 "Who Dares Wins" (#23-27, epilogue in #28) involves a squad of British SAS soldiers (Captain Page, Sergeant Eddie Baker, Plug, and Whitey) assigned to kill Tommy and Natt over a Gulf Storm "friendly fire" incident. This correlates with 'Men's Room Louie', a Mafia boss mad over Tommy's self-defense killing. The SAS, who do not survive the confrontation, manage to kill off Louie; Tommy and Nat are believed to be the killers.
 The issues in this trade were included in the larger "Tommy's Heroes" collection released in 2011.

Vol. 5: Tommy's Heroes (2011)
 "Who Dares Wins" (#23-27, epilogue in #28)
 In "Tommy's Heroes" (#29–33), looking to get away from the Men's Room Louie heat, Tommy and Natt (along with Ringo and Hacken) take a job offer in Africa. They are to train an army filled with forcibly enlisted unskilled men to fight the rebels, who are selling heroin to fund their insurgency. Tommy befriends a British Airborne soldier named Bob Mitchell who was friends with Eddie Baker (from "Who Dares Wins"). They soon realize that President Kijaro and his superhuman bodyguards, Scarlett Rose and the Skull, are evil. They meet the rebels, and Tommy is convinced to help install their leader, Christian Ributu, in Kijaro's place as long as he stops dealing heroin. Ributu is warned not to be like the other rulers, or Tommy will return.
 Hitman #1,000,000 was published as part of DC's One Million crossover. Tommy is transported to the 853rd Century by some punks who believe that he was a hero and he corrects their mistaken belief quite violently. Tommy also meets the successor to fellow Bloodlines hero Gunfire.
 In "Of Thee I Sing" (#34), a starstruck Tommy meets Superman on a Gotham rooftop. Superman has just rescued a group of astronauts, but was unable to save the final man. Everyone believes Superman will save them if need be, and he struggles under the burden of representing the power of the United States of America. Tommy tells him that the America that he represents is about the opportunity for people from all over the world to cast aside old baggage and join in the melting pot. Cheered up by the pep talk, Superman thanks Tommy and signs an autograph before flying back to Metropolis. He remains oblivious to the fact that Tommy is actually on the roof to assassinate a local criminal.
 In "Katie / Father's Day" (#35–36), Tommy's half-sister Frances comes to Gotham and explains his family history. His mother was a local prostitute who named her children after their fathers. Tom Dawson was a violent man who did not want his secrets exposed and killed her. Dawson later tracks down Frances and tortures her to death; Tommy kills Dawson in revenge.

Vol. 6: For Tomorrow (2012)
 In "Dead Man's Land" (#37–38), Tommy and his friends destroy a nearby vampire nest; he befriends a local woman named Maggie.
 This is a crossover with the Batman arc No Man's Land. The characters discuss many of the seemingly yearly big events and how they relate to them. It also features a vampire character from past issues of Hellblazer written by Garth Ennis.
 In "For Tomorrow" (#39–42, epilogue in #43), Tommy tells Tiegel he loves her, and she asks if he loves her enough to quit being a hitman, theoretically. Ringo has been seeing Wendy (from the first two arcs), but she realizes he is a hitman and dumps him. Ringo is targeted by the father of a man he had killed. Tommy becomes swept up in the events; Ringo does not survive the battle. Tommy later kills the father. The arc was dedicated to John Woo and Chow Yun-fat.
 In "Fresh Meat" (#44–46), while at the Injun Peak scientific facility, a mistake literally leads Tommy and Natt to the time of the dinosaurs. Then a pack of T. rexes, led by the clever Scarback, come to Gotham in the modern day. Many are killed, but the rest decide to go home because the pollution made the city and its people literally distasteful.
 In "The Old Dog" (#47–49, epilogue in #50), men's Room Louie's granddaughter Isabella celebrates her wedding, and her uncle Benito Gallo (a knife-wielding Mafia hitman) offers to kill Tommy. Benito's attempt only wounds Tommy. While recuperating, Tommy finally realizes Sean is his 'true' father; having raised him all these years. A battle breaks out, with Tommy and his friends holed up in Noonan's bar. Eventually, Benito is taken hostage. This ends badly, as Benito slips his bonds while alone with Sean and both men end up killing each other. The epilogue happens fifty years later; four friends are sightseeing through Noonan's, because of a book based (loosely) on Tommy's exploits. They meet an aged Hacken, who tells them that Tommy killed dozens (excepting children) at Isabella's wedding; a brief scene shows her dead body draped over the altar. The title is the inscription that Sean has requested on his tombstone. In the end, Tommy instead puts "Beloved Father".

Vol. 7: Closing Time (2012)
 Hitman/Lobo: That Stupid Bastich: In this one-shot crossover, Lobo comes to Noonan's one night. Tommy gets in a fight with him and is pursued across town. He uses perverted blackmail to get the alien to leave him alone.
 "How To Be A Super-Hero!": Around the time of #34, Ennis wrote this short story in Superman 80-Page Giant #1. Sixpack dreams that he is patrolling Metropolis, and Superman asks to tag along. Superman lectures him about the need for proof, the downside to burning prisons, and not stabbing muggers with broken bottles.
 In "Super-Guy" (#51–52), an Injun Peak scientist and colleague of Doctor Jackson possesses his assistant with a group of demons known as the "Multi-Angled Ones". The assistant, who now has the power to literally pull any object from his rectum, goes on a rampage and Tommy and Natt are sent to deal with him. They successfully kill the assistant, only to free the Multi-Angled Ones in the process. Meanwhile, Sixpack sees the commotion and convinces a disillusioned and directionless Section 8 to rally and defeat the menace. The demons promptly slaughter most of Section 8, while gloating that nothing will stop them from turning Earth into Hell. Sixpack's deluded bravery still impresses them, so he is challenged to a fight for his soul, with Earth's existence on the line. Sixpack agrees, and he and the demons disappear forever afterwards; and a statue is erected in his memory. Bueno Excelente is the only presumed survivor of Section 8 from the attack (he avenges the team by sexually assaulting Doctor Jackson to death); however, a man resembling Sixpack in his civilian identity is seen at an AA meeting, seemingly at peace.
 In "Closing Time" (#53–60) the final story, the Mafia put a $2,000,000 contract on Tommy's head after the wedding massacre and many would-be assassins try to collect. Tiegel's grandfather dies, and Tommy tells her they cannot see each other any more, because he is bad for her. He gives her all the money he has saved, and she goes to New York. CIA agents in the employ of Truman (from "Local Heroes") want to kill Maggie Lorenzo (from "Dead Man's Land") because she saw an escaped subject of his experiment duplicate the effects of the Bloodlines incident. Maggie seeks out Tommy, and finds him at the bar. Kathryn McAllister (from "Local Heroes") arrives, saying that she has left Truman's employ over his growing paranoia regarding superhumans. She contacts her friends at the FBI who want to take Truman down, but they offer only a helicopter with very little support.
 Truman hires Marc Navarone, the son of Johnny Navarone (from "10,000 Bullets"), to kill Tommy, whom he regards as a loose end. An aging policeman named Connolly (mentioned in "The Old Dog") hears about the CIA plots, and kidnaps Tommy to protect him as a posthumous favor to Sean. After a few flashbacks, Natt and McAllister find Connolly's apartment and free Tommy without killing Connolly. Tommy, Natt, and McCallister shoot up Truman's place, slaying many of Truman's men in the process. They are so overwhelmed by the horrors of Truman's experiments that Marc gets the drop on Tommy, but, having never killed anyone outside of practice, he accidentally leaves the gun's safety on. Tommy snatches the gun and shoots him.
 Truman escapes and gathers his remaining two hundred men. McAllister picks up the helicopter and heads to Noonan's, where Tommy and Natt share one last beer. They walk outside, and Truman's men open fire. Tommy loses multiple fingers due to a well-placed bullet. Connolly is forced to watch, but has been forbidden to interfere by the Gotham PD brass. Natt is shot in the chest, but kills his attacker. Moments later, he falls during the run for the helicopter. He pleads with Tommy to not to leave him alive to be experimented on. McAllister tries to get Tommy to stay on the helicopter, but he runs back to defend his friend. Tommy lays down covering fire; Truman catches a bullet between the eyes and dies. Tommy is shot down by the remaining men. The series ends with a badly wounded Natt and Tommy fantasizing about a version of Noonan's where the beer is free, no guns are allowed and all their deceased friends are alive.

JLA/Hitman miniseries
Clark Kent is being interviewed about Superman's connection to notorious killer Tommy Monaghan. Taking the conversation off the record, he tells a story of how the JLA intercepted a rocket which was filled with a new strain of the Bloodlines virus. They needed a living being who had been exposed to the virus already and survived. Batman took the chance to grab Tommy, whom he regarded as a minor nuisance, killing two birds with one stone.

In the Watchtower, Batman criticizes Green Lantern for having teamed up with Tommy, until Superman walks in and is pleased to see Tommy. Batman tells Superman that Tommy is a killer, and Superman is suddenly torn, because the advice Tommy had given is still helping him. The rocket arrives at the moon. The White House, in fear of the aliens, launches nuclear weapons at the Watchtower.

The corrupted astronauts invade. Each has their own powers. The JLA soon find themselves powerless. The team mount a counterattack but, one by one, most fall. Wonder Woman sacrifices herself so Tommy can continue on. Tommy talks an infected Superman into overcoming his own alien.

Over the course of the battle, Tommy kills all the astronauts and the aliens. The nuclear attack on the Watchtower is called off.

Superman is torn, but the rest of the League are critical of Tommy's actions. Batman has him arrested, but the cops who process him are local 'Cauldron' boys and release him in lieu of gambling debts.

In the present day, Superman admits that he admires Tommy's moral courage in the extreme situation and mourns his passing.

Other appearances
Prior to his own series, Hitman was introduced during Garth Ennis's run on The Demon. After the aforementioned appearance in Annual #2, he appeared in two later arcs:
 "Hell's Hitman" (#42-45) - Etrigan, newly appointed as "Hell's Hitman", is at war with Lord Asteroth, an Archfiend of Hell, over the fate of Gotham. After being overwhelmed by his Choirboy Commandoes, Etrigan hires Tommy to take out Asteroth in issue #43. Tommy telepathically learns that Asteroth is sacrificing people to bring about Hell on Earth. He shoots the Choirboy Commandoes and Asteroth's other men, but flees rather than kill police officers. Etrigan deals with the supernatural menaces, but decides not to pay Tommy for his services (this also featured the first appearance of the Master Baytor).
 "Suffer the Children" (#52-54) - After Jason Blood's daughter is born, he decides to destroy Etrigan. He hires Tommy to help him, specifically guarding him against Merlin the Magician (Etrigan's younger half-brother). Tommy only agrees because Blood promises him $2,000,000. Etrigan escapes and kidnaps the baby, and, when Merlin aids him, Tommy shoots the magician. Jason saves the baby, and Tommy defends him while he steals Etrigan's heart, essentially neutering the demon and binding him to Jason's will. Tommy pinches Etrigan's cheeks, knowing Blood will not allow the demon to hurt him.

He also made an appearance in Batman Chronicles #4, building to the release of the series. The Annual and the Batman issue are included in the first trade paperback.

During Grant Morrison's run on JLA, Tommy was briefly considered for membership. The only reason he shows up is to check out Wonder Woman with his X-ray vision, after which he turns down their offer due to low pay.

He has also appeared in the titles Azrael, Sovereign Seven and Resurrection Man, none written by Garth Ennis. The majority of Sovereign Seven is considered non-canonical due to the revelation in the last issue.

He cameos in 2014's Batman and Robin #27, where Batman escapes into Noonan's bar from the old Gotham Prohibition tunnels. In the bar Batman meets Hacken, who offers him and his prisoner a drink. Batman declines and leaves, passing pictures of all the main cast of Hitman.

In other media
Tommy Monaghan is mentioned in the Justice League Unlimited episode "Double Date", where crime boss Steven Mandragora refers to him as a hired killer who "accidentally" fell onto a train track and was killed.

Awards
Hitman won the Best New Comic (International) National Comics Award for 1997.

Dogwelder (from the team Section 8) was voted "Best New Character" of 1997 by the readers of Wizard.

Hitman issue #34, the Superman-starring "Of Thee I Sing", won the 1999 Eisner Award for Best Single Issue, presented to Ennis and McCrea. Issue #1,000,000 was a part of the DC One Million storyline, which was a top vote-getter for the Comics Buyer's Guide Fan Award for Favorite Story for 1999.

"For Tomorrow", in issues #39–42, was a top vote-getter for the Comics Buyer's Guide Fan Award for Favorite Story for 2000.

References

External links
Hitman on The Continuity Pages

1996 comics debuts
Characters created by Garth Ennis
Comics by Garth Ennis
DC Comics metahumans
DC Comics superheroes
DC Comics male superheroes
DC Comics telepaths
DC Comics martial artists
DC Comics military personnel
DC Comics titles
Eisner Award winners
Fictional assassins in comics
Fictional contract killers
Fictional characters with X-ray vision 
Fictional Gulf War veterans
Fictional gunfighters in comics
Fictional hapkido practitioners
Fictional United States Marine Corps personnel
Irish superheroes
Vigilante characters in comics